Sloan Canyon National Conservation Area is a National Conservation Area (NCA) administered by the United States Bureau of Land Management (BLM).  It includes the Sloan Petroglyph Site which was listed on the National Register of Historic Places on December 19, 1978.  It is located south of Las Vegas, Nevada, access is available from Las Vegas Boulevard, near the Del Webb Anthem  development in Henderson. Sloan Canyon NCA protects .

Petroglyphs

Sloan Canyon contains a great many petroglyphs and has been called the Sistine Chapel of Native American rock art due to their size and significance. Archaeologists believe the more than 300 rock art panels with 1,700 individual design elements were created by native cultures from the Archaic to historic eras.

The BLM currently maintains a policy of not publicizing the exact location of the petroglyphs due to recent problems with vandalism. Access to the NCA is further hampered by the rapid development of private land and to ongoing conflicts over land use and zoning.

Sloan Canyon NCA is (as of November 2006) closed to camping, shooting and offroad vehicle access, due to dumping and vandalism. Hiking, biking and horseback riding are encouraged on existing roads and trails. The BLM asks that you respect the rock art, and be a responsible visitor.

The North McCullough Wilderness Area which covers the northern part of the McCullough Range is contained within the boundaries of the NCA.

Trailheads
Dutchman Pass (Mission Hills) on the east boundary
Quo Vadis on the east boundary
Hidden Valley on the west southern boundary
Petroglyph Canyon on the western boundary (South of Inspirada)
Shadow Canyon on the western mid boundary (Inside Solara)
Anthem Hills on the western north boundary (South Anthem)

See also
Category: Native American history of Nevada
Category: Puebloan peoples

References

Sources and external links

Sloan Canyon NCA website at BLM

Petroglyphs in Nevada
Native American history of Nevada
Canyons and gorges of Nevada
Tourist attractions in the Las Vegas Valley
Protected areas of the Mojave Desert
National Conservation Areas of the United States
Bureau of Land Management areas in Nevada
Archaeological sites on the National Register of Historic Places in Nevada
Protected areas of Nevada
National Register of Historic Places in Clark County, Nevada
Protected areas of Clark County, Nevada
Units of the National Landscape Conservation System
Landforms of Clark County, Nevada